Amplifier modeling (also known as amp modeling or amp emulation) is the process of emulating a physical amplifier such as a guitar amplifier. Amplifier modeling often seeks to recreate the sound of one or more specific models of vacuum tube amplifiers and sometimes also solid state amplifiers.

Types of modeling devices

Digital amp modelers
Standalone modeling devices such as the Line 6 POD (1998-) digitize the input signal and use a DSP, a dedicated microprocessor, to process the signal with digital computation, attempting to achieve the sound of expensive professional amplifiers in a much less costly and more compact device. These modelers can be connected directly to a recording device or PA system without having to use a power section, speaker cabinet and microphone; however, there is an ongoing debate over the question of how accurately a modeler can recreate the sound of a real amplifier. Most modelers generally also include a variety of effects apart from the amp emulations and some can be connected via USB for computer based recording.

Digital modeling amplifiers
Modeling amps such as the Peavey Vypyr, Roland Cube, Fender Mustang, and Line 6's Spider series are amplifiers that include a built-in modeling device. Some high-end modeling amplifiers such as the Vox Valvetronix and the 60/120 watt versions of the Peavey Vypyr combine the digital modeling process with actual vacuum tube amplification.

Analog emulators
Analog modeling systems also exist; in fact the first "modeling" devices were analog and utilized common analog circuitry in signal processing functions, such as filters, amplifiers, and "waveshapers". Conceptually "modeling" is an old scheme, and in essence one may regard a simple "diode clipper" waveshaper as an "emulation" of overdrive characteristics of certain (tube-based) designs. Similarly we may regard deliberate enhancement of frequency response as an emulation, assuming the emulated system likewise introduces a similarly enhanced response. During history, simple conceptual circuits of mimicking a certain attribute have topologically evolved to become more and more complex in order to provide a more "detailed" or "realistic" emulation outcome. Basically, the concept of analog signal processing is ancient but it is somewhat controversial when people began to refer to certain processing techniques as "modeling". Tech 21's SansAmp line of products (1989-) is one of the earliest examples of devices that were purposefully marketed as being capable of producing various "amplifier-specific" tones.

Digital vs analog device, DAW plugin software
Signal processing within the modeling concept can be realized with analog or digital circuitry, or combinations of them both. Digital amplifier modeling may appear as software, such as plugins for DAWs (digital audio workstations) which may be aided by computer hardware accelerators, or may be part of a standalone device or amplifier. 

As part of a digital audio workstation, amplifier modeling may be applied "after the fact", to a guitar signal that was recorded "clean", in order to achieve the sound of an amplifier being used. This process has the advantage of being dynamic—the amplifier settings can be adjusted without forcing the musician to re-record the piece.

Today many analog modeling circuits may have a digitally-controlled interface, and the analog signal paths within such units are often "re-routed" and reconfigured with aid of digital logic and semiconductor-based switching circuitry. In addition, many "digital" modeling devices that employ DSP may also employ analog modeling circuits.

Other examples of modeling circuit
A good example of a moderately complex analog modeling circuit is Peavey's "T-Dynamics" power amplifier design, which (using 100% analog circuitry) emulates complex clipping and bias-shifting characteristics of push-pull tube power amplifiers, as well as the typically high-ish output impedance of such. Vox "Valve Reactor" power amplifier, Hughes&Kettner "Dynavalve" power amplifier, Mesa Boogie Triaxis Tube Preamp, Pritchard guitar amplifiers and Quilter musical instrument amplifiers are other examples of units that feature analog circuit designs of similar nature. 

Roland's earliest "Blues Cube" amplifiers employed analog tube modeling circuitry, though Roland did not model specific tube amplifiers, more so the overall characteristics of a generic tube-based preamplifier circuit. Peavey's "TransTube" preamplifiers are designs of similar nature. Pritchard amplifiers also model characteristics of tube-based circuits in general and without attempt to model any "amp-specific" tones per se.

Roland and Line 6 employ analog power amplifier emulation in some of their amplifier models. Peavey's "Vypyr" series of modeling amplifiers utilises analog "TransTube" circuit instead of a digital waveshaper, and Vox Valvetronix amplifiers have throughout their history presented a marriage of semiconductor and vacuum tube -based analog modeling circuitry and digital signal processing circuitry.

References

Instrument amplifiers